A lavoir (wash-house) is a public place set aside for the washing of clothes. Communal washing places were common in Europe until industrial washing was introduced, and this process in turn was replaced by domestic washing machines and by launderettes. The English word is borrowed from the French language, which also uses the expression bassin public, "public basin".

Description

Lavoirs were built from the seventeenth to the early twentieth centuries. With Baron Haussmann's redesign of Paris in the 1850s, a free lavoir was established in every neighbourhood, and government grants encouraged municipalities across France to construct their own. Lavoirs are more common in certain areas, such as around the Canal du Midi.

Lavoirs are commonly sited on a spring or set over or beside a river. Many lavoirs are provided with roofs for shelter. With the coming of piped water supplies and modern drainage, lavoirs have been steadily falling into disuse although a number of communities have restored ancient lavoirs, some of which date back to the 10th century.

There are also bateaux-lavoirs ("laundry boats") in some towns on the banks of large rivers such as Paris and Lyon.

Gallery

See also
Laundry#Washhouses
Dhobi ghat, an outdoor laundry place in South Asia

References

External links 

  Lavoirs of France
  Les lavoirs de France
  Lavoirs in the department Aube
  Lavoirs in Champagne-Ardenne
  Lavoirs in Burgundy and Franche-comté

Laundry places
Buildings and structures by type
Water
Women's history